Vila Mariana may refer to:
 Subprefecture of Vila Mariana, São Paulo
 Vila Mariana (district of São Paulo)
 Vila Mariana (São Paulo Metro)